The winners of the 9th Vancouver Film Critics Circle Awards, honoring the best in filmmaking in 2008, were announced on January 13, 2009.

Winners and nominees

International
Best Actor: Sean Penn – Milk
Frank Langella – Frost/Nixon
Mickey Rourke – The Wrestler
Best Actress: Kate Winslet – Revolutionary Road and The Reader
Sally Hawkins – Happy-Go-Lucky
Meryl Streep – Doubt
Best Director: David Fincher – The Curious Case of Benjamin Button
Danny Boyle – Slumdog Millionaire
Gus Van Sant – Milk
Best Film: Milk
Slumdog Millionaire
WALL-E
Best Foreign Language Film: The Edge of Heaven (Auf der anderen Seite) • Germany
Let the Right One In (Låt den rätte komma in) • Sweden
Tell No One (Ne le dis à personne)  • France
Best Supporting Actor: Heath Ledger – The Dark Knight (posthumous)
Josh Brolin – Milk
Philip Seymour Hoffman – Doubt
Best Supporting Actress: Rosemarie DeWitt – Rachel Getting Married
Viola Davis – Doubt
Marisa Tomei – The Wrestler

Canadian
Best Actor: Natar Ungalaaq – The Necessities of Life (Ce qu'il faut pour vivre)
Antoine L'Écuyer – It's Not Me, I Swear! (C'est pas moi, je le jure!)
Jim Sturgess – Fifty Dead Men Walking
Best Actress: Marianne Fortier – Mommy Is at the Hairdresser's (Maman est chez le coiffeur)
Julianne Moore – Blindness
Preity Zinta – Heaven on Earth
Best British Columbia Film: Fifty Dead Men Walking
Edison and Leo
Stone of Destiny
Best Director: Philippe Falardeau – It's Not Me, I Swear! (C'est pas moi, je le jure!)
Atom Egoyan – Adoration
Deepa Mehta – Heaven on Earth
Best Film: It's Not Me, I Swear! (C'est pas moi, je le jure!)
Heaven on Earth
The Necessities of Life (Ce qu'il faut pour vivre)
Best Supporting Actor: Randy Quaid – Real Time
Gael García Bernal – Blindness
Mark Ruffalo – Blindness
Best Supporting Actress: Suzanne Clément – It's Not Me, I Swear! (C'est pas moi, je le jure!)
Maya Ritter – Finn's Girl
Jayne Eastwood – Real Time

References

2008
2008 film awards
2008 in Canadian cinema
2008 in British Columbia